Law with Two Phases, also known as Law with Two Faces is a 1984 Hong Kong film written and directed by the film's lead star Danny Lee in his second directorial outing.

Reception

Impact on Hong Kong Cinema
Law with Two Phases launched Danny Lee's career as an actor. At the time, Lee was not well known to Chinese audiences, having appeared in low-budget productions such Heroic Cops, a film which marked early appearances by then-unknowns Chow Yun-fat and Ng Man Tat.

Hong Kong films centering on Hong Kong police at the time often relied on comedy rather than action. The American film Dirty Harry is said to have inspired filmmakers to bring a more true-to-life representation of life "behind the shield" to the screen (It is probably no small coincidence that Lee later named his production company "Magnum", after Harry Callahan's weapon of choice).

Lee's performance in the film earned him a Hong Kong Film Award, as well as a Golden Horse Award. The film also helped usher in a new version of the police drama with its own visual styles and trademarks, such as everything being painted in shades of grey, and tinged with social resonance and blows of violence. The gritty, almost documentary-like style and cinematography was a bold charge against the almost cartoonish look of many action films of the time, and audiences, critics, and fellow directors responded.

External links
 Law with Two Phases Review
 
 

1984 films
1980s Cantonese-language films
1980s crime thriller films
Hong Kong action films
1980s Hong Kong films